Easy Pickings is a 1927 silent film mystery or 'old dark house' story directed by George Archainbaud and starring Anna Q. Nilsson and Kenneth Harlan. It is based on a play written by Paul A. Cruger and William A. Burton. Zack Williams plays the stereotypical Negro servant who mugs his way through the film in an exaggeratedly nervous manner. Comedic actor Billy Bevan plays the detective in the film in a more-serious-than-usual manner, and later went on to appear in Dracula's Daughter (1936) and The Invisible Man Returns (1940).

Lead actress Nilsson emigrated from Sweden to Hollywood to appear in a number of silent films, but her career could not survive the coming of sound films. Cameraman Van Enger had photographed the 1925 Lon Chaney classic The Phantom of the Opera, and years later would handle the camerawork on Abbott and Costello Meet Frankenstein (1948). Director Archainbaud wound up directing TV shows in the 1950s such as The Gene Autry Show and Lassie.

Plot
Mary Ryan and Peter Van Horne get stranded in a haunted house inhabited by some very odd characters. The house is supposed to be haunted by ghosts. A detective (Billy Bevan) shows up to investigate the strange goings-on.

Cast
Anna Q. Nilsson - Mary Ryan
Kenneth Harlan - Peter Van Horne
Philo McCullough - Stewart
Billy Bevan - The Detective
Jerry Miley - Tony
Charles Sellon - Dr. Naylor
Zack Williams - Remus, the black servant
Gertrude Howard - Mandy

Preservation
A copy resides in Italy at Cineteca Nazionale, Rome.
At one time the film was considered lost.

References

External links
Easy Pickings at IMDb.com

1927 films
American silent feature films
Films directed by George Archainbaud
First National Pictures films
American black-and-white films
American mystery films
1920s rediscovered films
1927 mystery films
Rediscovered American films
1920s American films
Silent mystery films